Hechtia laevis is a species of plant in the genus Hechtia. This species is endemic to Mexico.

References

laevis
Flora of Mexico